Saulo do Amaral Freire Oliveira Souza (born March 22, 1989), best known as Saulo Roston, is a Brazilian pop singer and songwriter. He rose to fame after winning the fourth season of the reality television show Ídolos Brazil.

Biography

Saulo was born in 1989 in Presidente Epitácio, São Paulo. He began singing at age 12, and at 13, did a concert for 4000 people. With the constant support of parents, Roston did a few months of singing lesson in São Paulo. He studied guitar and also a bit of piano. 
 
At age 15, he moved to Goiânia, Goiás and kept singing in bars. At 17, he moved to Malaysia to do an exchange program with his local Rotary club. After a rough year, he returned to Brazil in early 2007, where he spent some downtime in his home city. Saulo had huge ambitions and decided to try out for Ídolos Brazil third season, however was eliminated in the Top 30. Saulo did not give up, returned to the show and ranked prominently in the fourth season, beginning his unpredictable rise to stardom.

Ídolos Brazil

Overview

Roston first auditioned for the third season of Ídolos Brazil when he made all the way to the Top 30, but was cut prior to the Top 10. A year later, he auditioned again, this time for the fourth season. Both his auditions took place in São Paulo, São Paulo.

Performances

Career
Roston signed a recording contract with Warner Music Brasil, managed by Rede Record in December 2009.

Nova Paixão
Studio recording sessions for the eponymous major label debut Saulo Roston ran in São Paulo, São Paulo, early 2010. Saulo Roston: Nova Paixão was released on March 25, 2010 in Brazil, with the song "Nova Paixão" (English: New Passion) as first single.

Music Video
The music video was directed by actor Alexandre Frota. Filming started on March 12, 2010 on Rio de Janeiro, Rio de Janeiro. All the action takes place in a futuristic flat, mounted in the Rede Record's studios. Actress Karen Junqueira play the role of Saulo's love interrese. The video premiered on March 25, 2010.

Discography

 Saulo Roston: Nova Paixão (2010)

References

External links
Saulo Roston Official website

1989 births
21st-century Brazilian male singers
21st-century Brazilian singers
Idols (TV series) winners
Living people
People from São Paulo (state)